Carlisle is a city in Cumbria, England.

Carlisle may also refer to:

Places

Antigua and Barbuda 
 Carlisle, Saint George, in Saint George Parish

Australia
 Carlisle, Western Australia
 Carlisle River, Victoria

Canada
 Carlisle, Edmonton, Alberta
 Carlisle, Hamilton, Ontario
 Carlisle, Middlesex County, Ontario
 New Carlisle, Quebec

United Kingdom
 Carlisle, a city and the county town of Cumbria, England, United Kingdom
 The City of Carlisle, a local government entity, including Carlisle, surrounding areas, and other towns
 The County Borough of Carlisle, a former city and local government district located within the county of Cumberland (now Cumbria), England
 Carlisle (UK Parliament constituency), centred on the City of Carlisle
 Carlisle railway station, serving the urban settlement
 Carlisle United F.C., a professional association football
Carlisle Park, London
Carlisle Park, Morpeth, Northumberland

United States
 Carlisle, Alabama
 Carlisle, Arkansas
 Carlisle, Indiana
 Carlisle, Iowa
 Carlisle, Kentucky
 Carlisle, Louisiana
 Carlisle, Massachusetts
 Carlisle Public Schools A small school district in  Carlisle, Massachusetts
 Carlisle, Minnesota
 Carlisle, Mississippi
 Carlisle, Michigan (disambiguation)
 Carlisle, Nebraska
 Carlisle, New York
 Carlisle, Ohio (in Warren and southern Montgomery counties)
 Carlisle, Oklahoma
 Carlisle, Noble County, Ohio
 Carlisle, Pennsylvania
 Carlisle Indian Industrial School, a Native American boarding school located in Carlisle, Pennsylvania
 Carlisle, South Carolina
 Carlisle, Tennessee, see Tennessee State Route 49
 Carlisle, Texas
 Carlisle, West Virginia
 Carlisle County, Kentucky
 Mount Carlisle, Alaska
 New Carlisle, Indiana
 New Carlisle, Ohio

Other uses
 Carlisle (surname)
 Carlisle (given name)
 The Carlisle Collection, an American fashion design company
 Carlisle Companies, an American company based in Arizona making materials for construction and transportation
 Earl of Carlisle, a title in the Peerage of England
 HMS Carlisle, three ships of the Royal Navy
Carlisle Indian Industrial School
Carlisle Indians football

See also
 New Carlisle (disambiguation)
 Carlile (surname)
 Carlyle (disambiguation)